Grant Township is a township in Page County, Iowa, USA.

History
Grant Township was established in 1870.

References

Townships in Page County, Iowa
Townships in Iowa